Alice Halstead is a London-based soprano.

Halstead has recorded solos for John Rutter's Visions and Requiem (2016) and for Karl Jenkins' Stella Natalis (2009) 

From 2012 to 2016 Halstead sang under Graham Ross (musician) in the Choir of Clare College, Cambridge.

As a chorister at St. Alphege's Church, Solihull, she won the title of "BBC Radio 2 Young Chorister of the Year 2008" in front of an audience of over 1,000 people in St. Paul's Cathedral, London, in October 2008.   Halstead has since performed on UK national radio and television.

Halstead appeared on BBC One Songs of Praise on 22 February 2009, and 16 August 2009 singing "Ave Maria" by Michael Head and appeared on September 27, 2009, singing "He Shall Feed His Flock" from Handel's Messiah.

She recorded excerpts from the Messiah for BBC Radio 2 in St. Paul's Cathedral with the BBC Concert Orchestra in front of an audience of over 2,000 people, which was broadcast on Good Friday 2009. She has made several recordings for BBC Radio 2 Good Morning Sunday with Aled Jones, Sunday Half Hour and Friday Night is Music Night in London, Belfast, Manchester and Wells Cathedral.  She sang "O for the Wings of a Dove" live in Birmingham Town Hall as part of BBC Radio 3's Mendelssohn weekend in May 2009  and has led the singing for BBC Radio 4’s The Daily Service and Sunday Worship.

References

External links
 

Year of birth missing (living people)
Living people
English women singers